William Irvine Dudley Hayward  (born 15 April 1930) is a former Australian educator and first-class cricketer.

Life and career
Bill Hayward was born in the Adelaide beachside suburb of Glenelg, and attended St Peter's College, Adelaide, where he captained the cricket team in 1948. In 1949 he went to study at Jesus College, Cambridge. He gained his cricket Blue in 1950, 1951 and 1953 as an opening bowler. He took his best figures of 6 for 89 against Surrey in 1953. A week earlier he had taken eight wickets in the match against Nottinghamshire when the other Cambridge bowlers took only four.

After graduating, Hayward returned to Australia and became a school teacher. He was headmaster of the Anglican Church Grammar School in Brisbane from 1974 until his retirement in 1986. He was awarded the Medal of the Order of Australia in 1993 "for service to education particularly through the Queensland Association of Independent Schools".

References

External links
 
 Bill Hayward at CricketArchive

1930 births
Living people
Cricketers from Adelaide
People educated at St Peter's College, Adelaide
Alumni of Jesus College, Cambridge
Australian cricketers
Cambridge University cricketers
Australian headmasters
Recipients of the Medal of the Order of Australia
Marylebone Cricket Club cricketers